The 1894–95 Scottish Division Two was won by Hibernian, with Cowlairs finishing bottom.

Table

References

Scottish Football Archive

Scottish Division Two seasons
2